This is a list of the 8 former Provinces of Kenya (until 2013) by Human Development Index as of 2021.

See also 

 List of countries by Human Development Index

References 

Kenya
Kenya
Human Development Index